Chicago House Athletic Club is an American professional men's soccer club owned by Laurence Girard and led by CEO Peter Wilt. The club is based in Chicago, Illinois. They began play in August 2021, competing in the National Independent Soccer Association (NISA), a professional 3rd tier league.
The club currently play in the semi-professional Midwest Premier League.

History
On September 10, 2020, the National Independent Soccer Association (NISA) announced that an investor group, led by league founder Peter Wilt, had applied for a club to play in the Chicago market. Wilt had previously attempted to start a new Chicago team in 2016 with the North American Soccer League (NASL) and more recently in 2018, following his departure from NISA, successfully started the Madison, Wisconsin based Forward Madison FC in USL League One. Other investors included Bruce Merivale-Austin.

On November 5, NISA officially announced the team had been accepted with an aim to begin play in Fall 2021. In the following months, the team asked fans to submit potential team names that related to the history and culture of Chicago. The team selected 68 finalists and held a fan advisory poll bracket, dubbed "Moniker Madness", to determine the most popular option. The winner of the poll, "Chicago House" was unveiled as the official name on February 23, 2021, alongside the team crest and colors.

On January 27, 2021, the team confirmed that it would play home matches at SeatGeek Stadium in Bridgeview, Illinois. On February 2, former Chicago Fire FC player and all-time appearance leader C. J. Brown was announced as the team's first technical director and head coach.

On May 1, 2021, the team announced that Lindsey Morgan Sacks would become the new primary team owner, taking control of the club from Bruce Merivale-Austin.

On July 9, 2021, the team played their official first match in club history, losing 2–0 to amateur side FC Milwaukee Torrent in the 2021 NISA Independent Cup.

Two weeks later, the House defeated Union Dubuque FC by a score of 5–0 to end the Independent Cup campaign with a first win in club history.

The club finished 6th in its inaugural season, posting a 7-2-9 record. Wojciech Wojcik was the team's top scorer, notching eight goals.

In March 2022, it was announced via social media that the club would join the Midwest Premier League for the upcoming season.
CEO Wilt also expressed intent to return to NISA in 2023.

The House announced its initial Midwest Premier League schedule via social media and also announced it would play its home matches at Stuart Field, on the campus of Illinois Institute of Technology.

Club identity

The club's name, Chicago House Athletic Club, was announced on February 21, 2021, and refers to the Chicago house style of music. It was one of 400 entries submitted for a public contest; the 68 finalist names were picked through public votes in a bracket tournament. The club's logo uses civic symbols of Chicago as well as the city skyline and depicts the Chicago River. The team's colors are "Patina Green", black, and "deep rust" (a shade of orange).

Players and staff

Current roster

Fall 2021 stats can be found here. 

2021 roster below

2022 roster below

4 players have confirmed to return from the previous season. 

The roster below shows the lineup for the home opener on Friday May 13th 2022.

Front office
  Lindsey Morgan Sacks – Owner
  Peter Wilt – CEO
  Night Train Veeck – COO
  Matt Poland – Technical director and head coach

References

External links
 

National Independent Soccer Association teams
Soccer clubs in Illinois
2020 establishments in Illinois
Soccer clubs in Chicago
Association football clubs established in 2020